"Bad command or file name" is a common and ambiguous error message in MS-DOS and some other operating systems.

COMMAND.COM, the primary user interface of MS-DOS, produces this error message when the first word of a command could not be interpreted. For MS-DOS, this word must be the name of an internal command, executable file or batch file, so the error message provided an accurate description of the problem but easily confused novices. Though the source of the error had to be the first word (often a mistyped command), the wording gave the impression that files named in later words were damaged or had illegal filenames. Later, the wording of the error message was changed for clarity. Windows NT displays the following error message instead (where "foo" is replaced by the word causing error):

Some early Unix shells produced the equally cryptic "" for the same reasons. Most modern shells produce an error message similar to "".

See also
Abort, Retry, Fail?
List of DOS commands

References

Computer error messages
DOS on IBM PC compatibles